The functional constituency is a professional or special interest group involved in the electoral process, they make up part of the political systems of Macau in legislative branch. Eligible voters in a functional constituency are designated legal entities such as organisations and corporations. Hong Kong has a similar political system.

List of functional constituencies
Legislative Assembly of Macau has twelve functional constituency seats. They represent:

Industry, Commerce and Finance
Industry, Commerce and Finance (工商、金融界) represented by the Macau Business Interest Union.

Labour
Labour (勞工界) represented by the Employees Association Joint Candidature Commission.

Professional
Professional (專業界) represented by the Macau professional Interest Union.

Welfare and Education
Welfare and Education (社會服務、教育界) represented by the Association for Promotion of Social Services and Education.

Culture and Sport
Culture and Sport (文化、體育界) represented by the Excellent Culture and Sports Union Association.

Defunct constituencies
Welfare, Culture, Education and Sport

Moral, Healthcare, Cultural

Economic

Moral

Healthcare

Cultural

See also
Corporatism
Vocational panels in Ireland
Rotten and pocket boroughs
Functional constituency (Hong Kong)

References

External links
 Legislative Assembly of the Macao Special Administrative Region

Legislative Assembly of Macau
Constituencies